A majorette is a baton twirler whose twirling performance is often accompanied by dance, movement, or gymnastics; they are primarily associated with marching bands during parades. Majorettes can also spin knives, fire knives, flags, light-up batons, fire batons, maces and rifles.  They do illusions, cartwheels, and flips, and sometimes twirl up to four batons at a time. Majorettes are often confused with cheerleaders; baton twirling, however, is more closely related to rhythmic gymnastics than to cheerleading.

Origin and development

Majorettes performed originally a typical carnival dance originating in the Rhineland, where the young women who perform this dance are called “Tanzmariechen” (Dance Marys) in German or ‘’Dansmarietjes’’ in Dutch.

During the carnival the normal form of government is parodied. Also the army and the defense forces were traditionally parodied as a way of protesting against the Prussian occupation of the Rhenish area at the time. In Cologne, these imitations arose in particular to make Prussian militarism look ridiculous. And with a joke army that did just about everything, it would make a normal company look ridiculous.

The tanzmariechen show clear origins in the camp followers in the 18th and 19th century, and have a vibrant and eventful past. Around this time Germany had a very large number of armies, and there would be young women in each regiment, who served during the day as sellers and providers of food and drink and took on household chores like washing clothes. At the same time, many of these women and girls offered themselves as prostitutes, for which they would dress themselves more provocatively, and they would dance for the soldiers.

Around 1800 more regulations began to emerge in the armies. Slowly these were also applied to the camp followers. Increasingly, the camp follower was a woman who was married to a corporal or private, and whose task it was among other things “to wash the linen”, according to an old army decision.
The camp follower became not a typical army prostitute anymore, but also not a proper married women. Besides caring for the soldiers, she could still continue entertaining them in various ways.

In the carnival mockery both the officers and the camp followers were depicted. The officer by portraying him as an effeminate, wig-wearing, conceited fool, the camp follower as a woman who was military but provocatively costumed, but also clearly recognizable as a man: the Tanzmarie.

In the late nineteenth century, the carnival associations found further inspiration in the revue girls that performed in the theater at the time. These were scantily clad young women, accompanied by some military attributes like peak helmets and military backpacks, which showed provocative dances in small groups. The revue girl grew into a nightclub-like star. It can not be denied that the carnival with its Tanzmariechen has popularized and even parodied the sparkling shows that could otherwise be enjoyed only in the major European cities. Young women and girls again took on the role of tanzmariechen instead of men and they performed at the parades during the post-war carnival. A show element was added to carnival, partly because of rapidly evolving ballet education. Majorettes or tanzmariechen began increasingly to act in groups. Some parts of the Prussian military background are sometimes still reflected today in the movements, music or clothing of the majorettes.

The somewhat slovenly camp follower who accompanied the troops has evolved into a show dance group, but still inspired by the Prussian army. This metamorphosis went through the intermediate step of the role performed by men as Tanzmarie.
Although the current majorette has her roots in the carnival scene, the associations of majorettes widely break these historical ties, and profile themselves more as a sports or dance club.

Fictional majorettes
Jetta Handover (Kath Soucie) from the TV series Clifford the Big Red Dog.
Adrian Lee (Francia Raisa) from the TV series The Secret Life of the American Teenager.
Vicky from the horror movie The Majorettes.
Sakura Kinomoto from the anime series Cardcaptor Sakura.
Bunty Carmichael (Catherine Tate) from the TV series The Catherine Tate Show.
Lila da Mintgomory (Madonna Ciccone) from the concert series The MDNA Tour.
Aqua (Willa Holland) from the video game Kingdom Hearts: Birth By Sleep performs a baton twirling routine with her Keyblade when she uses the "Break Time" command. In the version that appears in Kingdom Hearts HD 2.5 Remix (based on the "Final Mix" version), doing this results in earning the "Majorette" trophy.
Frankie Bergstein from Grace and Frankie. Mentioned in Season 2 Episode 4.

See also
Cheerleader
Pep flags
Color guard
Dance squad
Marching band

References

External links 

Dance occupations
Cheerleading
Gymnastics
Marching bands